Andorra has participated in the Eurovision Song Contest six times, debuting in the 2004 contest and participating every year thereafter until the 2009 contest.  the nation remains the only country to have never competed in a grand final, with their best result being a 12th-place finish in the 2007 semi-final,  and thus failing to qualify. Andorra withdrew from the contest following their 2009 appearance, with the national broadcaster Ràdio i Televisió d'Andorra (RTVA) citing quoting financial difficulties preventing their continued participation. The country has not entered the contest again since. Interest in the contest has however remained high in the principality, while statements from the Andorran government and broadcaster indicated a return was possible, depending on financial backing.

A televote has principally been used to determine the nation's points, however due to the country's small population, on occasion a jury has been required as the number of votes received from the Andorran public has been too low to be considered valid.

Contest history 
Participation in the Eurovision Song Contest is open to members of the European Broadcasting Union (EBU), of which Andorra has been a member since 2002 through Ràdio i Televisió d'Andorra (RTVA). Interest in Andorran participation in the contest was first raised in 2003, when the country's then-head of government Marc Forné Molné indicated his agreement for the country to enter the contest, seeing it as a way to raise their profile at a reasonable cost. Andorra Televisió subsequently broadcast  live as a passive participant, a prerequisite step for participation in the following year's event under the rules of the contest in place at the time.

Marian van de Wal was chosen to perform "La mirada interior" at the contest, however Andorra once again failed to qualify for the final, placing 23rd of 25 countries in the 2005 semi-final with 27 points.

After initially applying to take part in the Eurovision Song Contest 2010 in Oslo, Norway, RTVA subsequently announced their withdrawal from the contest, citing financial difficulties.

Budget restrictions have continued to prevent Andorra from returning to the contest, with RTVA having previously considered leaving the EBU in order to recoup costs, which would have prevented any further Andorran participation in the event. In recent years, renewed interest in the contest has been reported among some members of the Andorran government, with past Andorran Eurovision artists having also been vocal in their support for a return of the nation to the contest. Georgi, Andorra's last participant, also started a campaign to secure a potential sponsorship which would enable Andorra to return to the contest and lobbied with Andorran politicians on this idea.  Andorra is the only country to have never participated in a grand final; 2007 remains the country's best result to date, when Anonymous placed 12th in that year's semi-final with 80 points, 11 points away from qualifying.

Selection process 
Andorra has used a mix of methods to select their entries for the contest, having employed both national finals and internal selections. For their debut entry, RTVA launched a casting show, to determine two acts to take part in the national final.

Voting 

In the years where Andorra participated, voting at the Eurovision Song Contest typically consisted of 100 percent public televoting, with countries obligated to use televoting as the method for determining their points from the 2004 contest. However, each country was obligated to assemble a back-up jury, whose votes would be used instead of the televote in cases of technical failure, or from 2005 when the number of televotes registered failed to pass a certain threshold. RTVA utilised SMS voting to determine the country's points during the shows in which Andorra participated, however on occasion the back-up jury results were required to be implemented as the number of votes received was considered too low to provide a valid result. This occurred in 2005 and 2007, when the votes of Andorra's back-up jury were used instead to provide the Andorran votes in both the semi-final and final.

Participation overview

Related involvement

Heads of delegation 
The public broadcaster of each participating country in the Eurovision Song Contest assigns a head of delegation as the EBU's contact person and the leader of their delegation at the event. The delegation, whose size can greatly vary, includes a head of press, the contestants, songwriters, composers and backing vocalists, among others.

Commentators and spokespersons 

For the show's broadcast on Andorra Televisió (ATV), various commentators have provided commentary for the contest in the local language. At the Eurovision Song Contest after all points are calculated, the presenters of the show call upon each voting country to invite each respective spokesperson to announce the results of their vote on-screen.

Gallery

References 

 
Countries in the Eurovision Song Contest